Helgoland class may refer to either of the following:
 , a class of German battleships built before World War I
 , a class of German ocean-going tug boats